Dev-Pascal is a free integrated development environment (IDE) distributed under the GNU General Public License for programming in Pascal and Object Pascal. It supports an ancient version of the Free Pascal compiler and GNU Pascal as backends. The IDE is written in Delphi. It can also handle the Insight Debugger. Dev-Pascal runs on Microsoft Windows.

See also

 Lazarus (IDE)
 Dev-C++
 Comparison of integrated development environments

External links
 The Dev-Pascal development and resources page

Free software programmed in Delphi
Windows-only free software
Free integrated development environments
Free Pascal
Pascal (programming language) software